This is a list of towns and cities in Paraguay.

A
Abaí
Acahay
Aguaray
Alberdi
Alto Verá
Areguá
Arroyito
Asunción
Atyrá
Ayolas

B
Bella Vista, Amambay
Benjamín Aceval

C
Caacupé
Caaguazú
Caapucú
Caazapá
Cambyreta
Capiatá
Capiíbary
Capitán Bado
Capitán Mauricio José Troche
Capitán Meza
Capitán Miranda
Caraguatay
Carayaó
Carmen del Paraná
Cerrito
Ciudad del Este
Concepción
Coronel Bogado
Coronel Martínez
Coronel Oviedo
Curuguaty

D
Desmochados
Doctor Botrell
Doctor Cecilio Báez
Doctor Eulogio Estigarribia
Doctor Juan Manuel Frutos
Doctor Moisés Bertoni
Doctor Pedro P. Peña

E
Edelira
Encarnación

F
Fernando de la Mora
Fernheim Colony
Filadelfia
Fuerte Olimpo

G
General Artigas
General Delgado
General Elizardo Aquino
General Eugenio A. Garay
General Francisco Álvarez
General Higinio Morínigo
General Isidro Resquín
General José Eduvigis Díaz
Guarambaré
Guayaibi
Guazu-Cua

H
Hernandaríaz
Hohenhau
Horqueta
Humaitá

I
Independencia
Isla Pucu
Isla Umbú
Itacurubí de la Cordillera
Itacurubí del Rosario
Itanará
Itapé
Itapúa Poty
Itaquyry
Itauguá
Iturbe

J
José Falcón
José Fassardi
José Ocampos
Juan Emilio O'Leary

K
Karapaí
Katueté

L
La Pastoria
La Victoria
Lambaré
Laureles
Leandro Oviedo
Limpio
Luque

M
María Antonia
Mariano Roque Alonso
Mariscal Estigarribia
Mariscal Francisco Solano López
Mayor José Dejesús Martínez
Mayor Otaño
Mayor Pablo Lagerenza
Mbaracayú
Mbocayaty
Mbocayty del Yhaguy
Mbutuy
Mbuyapey
Menno Colony
Menno
Minga Guazú

N
Nanawa
Natalicio Talavera
Natalio
Neuland Colony
Nueva Alborada
Nueva Germania
Nueva Italia
Nueva Londres

Ñ
Ñacunday
Ñemby
Ñumí

O
Obligado

P
Paraguarí
Paso de Patria
Paso Yobai
Pedro Juan Caballero
Pilar
Pirayú
Pozo Colorado
Presidente Franco
Primero de Marzo
Puerto Pinasco

Q
Quiindy
Quyquyhó

R
Raúl Arsenio Oviedo
Repatriación

S
Salto del Guairá
San Alberto
San Bernardino
San Cosme y Damián
San Estanislao
San Ignacio
San José de los Arroyos
San Juan Bautista de Ñeembucú
San Juan Bautista
San Juan del Paraná
San Lorenzo
San Pablo
San Pedro de Ycuamandiyú
San Pedro del Paraná
San Rafael del Paraná
San Vicente Pancholo
Sapucaí

T
Tacuaras
Tacuatí
Tavaí
Tebicuary-mí
Tomás Romero Pereira
R. I. Tres Corrales
Tres de Mayo
Trinidad

U
Unión

V
Vaquería
Veinticinco de Diciembre
Villa Elisa
Villa Franca
Villa Hayes
Villa Oliva
Villalbín
Villarrica
Villeta

Y
Yabebyry
Yaguarón
Yasy Cañy
Yataity
Yataity del Norte
Yatytay
Yby Pytá
Ybycuí
Ybytimí
Yegros
Ygatimi
Yhú
Ypacaraí
Ypané
Ypehú
Yuty

Z
Zanja Pytá

See also
List of cities and towns in Paraguay by population
List of cities by country

 
Paraguay, List of cities in
Paraguay
Cities